Rameshwar Pattidar (10 November 1938 – 27 April 2021) was an Indian politician and a leader of Bharatiya Janata Party. He was imprisoned under MISA during the emergency in 1975. He was elected to the 6th Lok Sabha from Khargone in Madhya Pradesh state in 1977. He was re-elected to the Lok Sabha in 1989, 1991, 1996 and 1998 from the same constituency.

References 

Biographical sketch

People from Madhya Pradesh
1938 births
2021 deaths
India MPs 1977–1979
India MPs 1989–1991
India MPs 1991–1996
India MPs 1996–1997
India MPs 1998–1999
Lok Sabha members from Madhya Pradesh
Indians imprisoned during the Emergency (India)
People from Khargone
Bharatiya Janata Party politicians from Madhya Pradesh